(born February 3, 1952) is a Japanese actress. She won the award for best supporting actress at the 7th Hochi Film Award for Farewell to the Land.

Filmography
 Onna no Hosomichi: Nureta Kaikyo (1980)
 Farewell to the Land (1982)

References

1952 births
Living people
20th-century Japanese actresses
Actresses from Osaka
Japanese film actresses